Brian O'Connor, MRIA (born 1965) is an Irish social philosopher active in the tradition of continental European intellectual thought. O'Connor is a professor of philosophy at University College Dublin and director of the school of philosophy.  He has written extensively on German Idealism and Critical Theory, and is an expert on the philosopher, Adorno. O’Connor has also written on the subject of idleness in his 2018 book of the same name, which provided a comparative analysis of the philosophy of idleness. He was awarded a higher doctorate by the National University of Ireland in 2021. In May 2021, he was made a member of the Royal Irish Academy.

Books

References 

 

1965 births
Living people
Irish philosophers
Alumni of University College Dublin
Academics of University College Dublin
21st-century Irish philosophers
Critical theorists
Members of the Royal Irish Academy
National University of Ireland